Il mostro di Firenze ("The Monster of Florence") is a 2009 Italian six parts mystery-drama television miniseries directed by Antonello Grimaldi.  It depicts actual events surrounding the  murders of  the Monster of Florence and the investigation to discover his identity.

Main cast
Ennio Fantastichini as  Renzo Rontini
Nicole Grimaudo as Silvia Della Monica
Marit Nissen as  Winnie Rontini
Giorgio Colangeli as  Michele Giuttari
Bebo Storti as  Pierluigi Vigna
Marco Giallini as  Ruggero Perugini
Tiziana Di Marco as  Pia Rontini
Corso Salani as  Paolo Canessa
Massimo Sarchielli as  Pietro Pacciani
Massimo Bianchi as  Giancarlo Lotti
Francesco Burroni as  Mario Vanni
Stefano Gragnani as  Lorenzo Nesi
Giacomo Carolei as  Claudio Stefanacci
Simona Caparrini as  Daniela Stefanacci 
Duccio Camerini as  Mario Rotella
Sergio Albelli as  Patrizio Pellegrini
Pietro De Silva as Pietro Fioravanti
Luigi Petrucci as  Giuliano Mignini
Vanni Fois as  Stefano Mele
Edoardo Gabbriellini as  Natalino Mele  
Pietro Fornaciari as Piero Mucciarini
Sandro Ghiani as  Giovanni Mele
Sergio Forconi as  Mauro Poggiali
Antonello Grimaldi as  Francesco Bruno
Daria Nicolodi as  La sensitiva

References

External links
 

2009 television films
2009 films
2000s Italian-language films
Italian television films
Italian films based on actual events
Films directed by Antonello Grimaldi